Liliuokalani Park and Gardens is a  park with Japanese gardens, located on Banyan Drive in Hilo on the island of Hawaii.

The park's site was donated by Queen Liliuokalani, and lies southeast of downtown Hilo, on the Waiakea Peninsula in Hilo Bay. Much of the park now consists of Edo-style Japanese gardens, built 1917-1919, and said to be the largest such gardens outside Japan. The gardens contain Waihonu Pond as well as bridges, ponds, pagodas, statues, torii, and a Japanese teahouse.

Included in the park is the small island called Moku ola, (also known as Coconut Island), connected to the park by a footbridge. It is a good place for a picnic, and some limited swimming. The name Moku ola literally means "island of life" in the Hawaiian language, since it was the site of an ancient temple dedicated to healing.
There is a stone tower on the east side of the island which is the remnant of the old footbridge which was destroyed by a tsunami.
From Coconut Island one has a great view of Hilo Bayfront, Downtown Hilo, and the rest of Hilo Bay.  To the east, you can see the massive breakwater protecting Hilo Bay. It is located at coordinates .
It is maintained by the County of Hawaii and non-profit Friends of Liliuokalani Gardens.

In 2021, a bronze sculpture by local artist, Henry Bianchini, was relocated from the main garden area to a nearby location in Isle Beach Park.

The park is a popular location for public events, exercise, and dog-walking.

Gallery

References

See also 
 Liliuokalani Botanical Garden (located in Honolulu, Hawaii)
 List of botanical gardens in the United States

Japanese-American culture in Hawaii
Japanese gardens in the United States
Parks in Hawaii
Protected areas of Hawaii (island)
Gardens in Hawaii
Hilo, Hawaii
Monuments and memorials to Liliʻuokalani